Nǃxau ǂToma (short: Nǃxau, alternative spelling Gcao Tekene Çoma or Coma;  1944 – 5 July 2003) was a Namibian bush farmer and actor who starred in the 1980 film The Gods Must Be Crazy and its sequels, in which he played the Kalahari Bushman Xixo. The Namibian called him "Namibia's most famous actor".

Biography
Nǃxau was a member of the San, also known as Bushmen. He spoke Juǀʼhoan, Otjiherero and Tswana fluently, as well as some Afrikaans. He did not know his own exact age, and before his appearance in the films he had little experience beyond his home. He had only ever seen three white people before being cast, and when director Jamie Uys gave him his first cash payment of $300 for The Gods Must Be Crazy, he allegedly let it blow away in the wind because he did not understand its value. This was despite money already being a serious matter for other San, since many of them depended on purchased food and government aid and/or had enlisted in the South African Army due to the high wages it paid. He was, however, able to negotiate for near $500,000 for his appearance in the sequel. He came from a culture that did not value the material things that money could buy and consequently had not learned money management skills, although he used some of his income to build a brick house with running water and electricity for his family. He also bought a used car and subsequently hired a chauffeur, as he had no desire to learn to drive.

In addition to The Gods Must Be Crazy, Nǃxau starred in a series of sequels: The Gods Must Be Crazy II, Crazy Safari, Crazy Hong Kong and The Gods Must Be Funny in China. After his film career ended, he returned to Namibia, where he farmed maize, pumpkins and beans and kept several head of cattle (but no more than 20 at a time because, according to The Independent, without the complex farming systems of the "modern world", he had trouble keeping track of more). The Namibian local daily New Era stated that he simply could not count further than 20.

Nǃxau converted to Christianity and in July 2000, he was baptized as a Seventh-day Adventist.

On 5 July 2003, he died from multiple-drug-resistant tuberculosis while he was out on an excursion for hunting guineafowl. According to official estimates he was about 58 or 59 years old at the time. He was buried on 12 July in a semi-traditional ceremony at Tsumkwe, next to the grave of his second wife. He had six surviving children.

Filmography

Notes

References

External links

 

1944 births
2003 deaths
People from Otjozondjupa Region
Namibian actors
21st-century deaths from tuberculosis
Tuberculosis deaths in Namibia
San people
Converts to Adventism
Namibian Seventh-day Adventists
20th-century Namibian people
21st-century Namibian people